"Good Morning Judge" is a song by English art rock band 10cc, released as the second single from their 1977 album Deceptive Bends. The song became the group's sixth consecutive Top 10 single in the United Kingdom, reaching No. 5.

Music video
A music video was produced for the song that revolves around a fictional courtroom trial. It features Eric Stewart as the defendant who is alleged to have committed a grand theft auto, and Graham Gouldman as the judge in a court. Stewart and Gouldman also play various other characters with Paul Burges, including members of the jury. The trial eventually ends with the conviction of the defendant, who is incarcerated.

Personnel
Eric Stewart – vocals, piano, Moog synthesizer, backing vocals, slide guitar
Graham Gouldman – bass guitar, electric guitars, tambourine, backing vocals, six-string bass
Paul Burges – drums, tambourine, Wah piano, cabasa

Chart performance

References

External links 

 '10cc - Good Morning Judge' on YouTube / (C) Mercury Records Limited, 1977
 Lyrics to this song on Genius

10cc songs
1977 singles
Songs written by Eric Stewart
Songs written by Graham Gouldman
Mercury Records singles
1977 songs